The Whisky Priest or Whiskey Priest may refer to:
 "The Whisky Priest" (Yes Minister), an episode of Yes Minister
 Whiskey Priest, a 2005 novel by Alexander J. Motyl
 Whisky priest, a stock character
 Whisky priest, the unnamed protagonist in The Power and the Glory